Indium (111In) altumomab pentetate (INN) (USP, indium In 111 altumomab pentetate; trade name Hybri-ceaker) is a mouse monoclonal antibody linked to pentetate which acts as a chelating agent for the radioisotope indium-111. The drug is used for the diagnosis of colorectal cancer but has not been approved for use.

References

Monoclonal antibodies for tumors
Indium compounds
Antibody-drug conjugates
Radiopharmaceuticals